Andrea Sybille Weiermann-Lietz (born 15 December 1958 in Köln) is a German female former field hockey player who competed in the 1984 Summer Olympics.

References

External links
 
 

1958 births
Living people
German female field hockey players
Olympic field hockey players of West Germany
Olympic silver medalists for West Germany
Olympic medalists in field hockey
Field hockey players at the 1984 Summer Olympics
Medalists at the 1984 Summer Olympics
Sportspeople from Cologne